General Birch may refer to:

Noel Birch (1865–1939), British Army general
Richard James Holwell Birch (1803–1875), British East India Company general
Samuel Birch (military officer) (1735–1811), British Army major general